Gingerdead Man vs. Evil Bong is a 2013 American crossover horror comedy film produced by Full Moon Features, about a battle between the namesake characters from two other film series, The Gingerdead Man and Evil Bong.  The film was released October 29, 2013, on the Full Moon Features website as streaming video, with wider release November 12, 2013.

Synopsis
The Gingerdead Man is on a tropical island, being fanned by topless women. He ruminates on killing Sarah Leigh, the only person to best him, but does not know where she is. Suddenly, a newspaper blows by with information on Sarah’s upcoming “Bake off” and he starts planning her demise.

Larnell now owns and operates “Dick’s Head Shop” with girlfriend Velicity, and they briefly recount the events of the first three Evil Bong films in passing. In short: the gang is captured by Evil Bong, Eebee, but ultimately destroy her; the gang battles King Bong in the Amazon where Eebee is resurrected and helps them destroy the new threat; and the gang faces off against the alien Space Bong again with the help of Eebee. Larnell is dealing with two prospective buyers when Hambo the Clown (a shifty old clown with a pig nose) enters the shop. Larnell’s assistant String, a gruff little person with a fake eye patch, deals with Hambo, who is looking to sell an Ooga Booga replica to the store for some fast cash. String refuses Ham I’d offer when two tourists, entirely depicted through racist Asian stereotypes, enter the store asking for directions. Hambo inexplicably poses them for a photo, takes the picture and promptly leaves with it, thanking them and apparently satisfied. String sells the tourists on some marijuana paraphernalia and the pair leaves, yelling obscenities at String who had earlier been verbally berating the tourists with racist Asian names and phrases after they began taking pictures of him and point out his dwarfism. Larnell is still selling the two patrons on some glassware by allowing them to test it with his own marijuana when the pair reveal they actually have no money. Larnell has String kick them out, who ominously returns with a bloody switch blade. While he is out Larnell goes to a back room and pulls Eebee (thought dead) out from a hidden safe.

Rabbit enters the shop, now a traveling salesman after renouncing the Priesthood due to the church’s stance on marijuana, and bearing Evil Bong merchandise. He tries to sell it to Larnell who instead is interested in the replica Gingerdead Man cookie that Rabbit is eating. He directs him to a newly opened bakery nearby called Dough Re Mi Bakery, operates by Sarah who looks suspiciously like Luann (a reference to the characters both being played by Robin Sydney). Larnell goes to buy a cookie and Rabbit waits for him to return in the back and finds Eebee. He smokes from her and is pulled into her Bong World.
 
Meanwhile, Sarah Leigh is working with her two employees at the bakery during this time and one of them asks about her newspaper article covering the bakery’s opening. It also covers her history, which is when Larnell walks in and asks Sarah to visit his store so they can form a partnership promoting their two small business and she leaves. The Gingerdead Man kills both employees of the bakery while they have sex in the back. He then follows Sarah to Larnell’s shop. When Larnell and Sarah arrive at the shop, Luann, the girlfriend of Larnell’s former roommate and best friend Bachman, enters the shop asking about Brett. It is revealed that after defeating Space Bong, Brett and Bachman admitted their love for each other, moved to San Francisco and were married, to everyone's surprise. Luann insults Sarah and leaves angrily. Larnell enters the back room with Sarah expecting to find Rabbit and instead finds Eebee. The Gingerdead Man arrives and kills String by shoving a bong through his head. Larnell and Sarah escape him by entering the Bong World. Eebee convinces the Gingerdead Man she has the power to restore his human form if he smokes from her and enters the Bong World too so he follows Sarah and Larnell.

Gingerdead Man finds himself in a Bong World jungle and meets King Bong, who has been trapped inside the Bong World by Eebee since the events of Evil Bong 2. King Bong uses his Poontang Tribeswomen to send Gingey to the Pastry Tribunal, a court consisting of Cream Puff, Baguette, Tiny Tart, and Rasta Brownie where he is sentenced to eternal damnation: to be eaten and reformed repeatedly and forever. Meanwhile, Larnell and Sarah find Rabbit enjoying himself, having “mastered” the Bong World. He explains that the Bong World takes advantage and feeds off one's innermost desires, so escape they must think about not escaping. Gingey convinces the Tribunal to give him one chance at life as a cookie saying he will be good. Soon Larnell and Sarah are transported out of the Bong World to Eebee’s surprise. She insists the Gingerdead Man will not be escaping who, in the Bong World, encounters Rabbit. When Gingey asks where Sarah is so he can finally kill her, Rabbit uses the Tribeswomen to neutralize him. The final scene shows the Gingerdead Man smoking a joint while sitting on a rock in the Bong World.

Cast and Characters

 Robin Sydney as Sarah Leigh / Luann
 Tian Wang as Asian Tourist
 Mindy Robinson as Poontang Girl #1 / Bikini Girl #1
 Timothy A. Bennett as Perv Customer
 Orson Chaplin as Hesher #2
 Ryan Curry as Larry
 Sonny Carl Davis as Rabbit
 The Don as String
 Joss Glennie-Smith as Hesher #1
 Chanell Heart as Poontang Girl #2 / Bikini Girl #3
 John Patrick Jordan as Larnell
 Jinhee Joung as Asian Wife
 John Karyus as The Gingerdead Man Mouth
 Victoria Levine as Debbie
 Masuimi Max as Uber Poontang Girl / Bikini Girl #2
 Amy Paffrath as Velicity
 Chance A. Rearden as Hambo
 Megan Steele as Body Double
 Archive footage
 Brett Chukerman as Alistair McDowell (second Evil Bong movie)
 Brian Lloyd as Brett
 David Weidoff as Alistair McDowell (first Evil Bong movie)
 Gary Busey as Millard Findlemeyer
 Jacob Witkin as Cyril Cornwallis
 Mitch Eakins as Bachman
 Peter Stickles as Alistair McDowell (third Evil Bong movie)
 Tommy Chong as Jimbo Leary 
 Voice actors
 Michael A. Shepperd as King Bong (voice)
 Bob Ramos as The Gingerdead Man (voice)
 Tokie Jazman as Rasta Brownie (voice)
 Victoria De Mare as Tart (voice)
 Philip Kreyche as Cream Puff (voice)
 Jacques Aime LaBite as Baguette (voice)
 Michelle Mais as Evil Bong / Eebee (voice)

Release 
Gingerdead Man vs Evil Bong began streaming on the Full Moon Features app in October 2013, with a wider release in November 2013. It became available to rent on November 3, 2013 on Google Play, and Prime Video. In April 2022, the film became available to stream on Apple TV.

Tie-in Merchandise 
In celebration of the release, a limited edition cereal box was made available that depicts the titular characters on opposite sides of the box in with unique artwork. It comes with the DVD of the movie along with special features, and multi-grain cereal called "Nookie Crisp" or "Weedies" in reference to the characters.

Sequel 
In 2014 Charles Band (The founder of Full Moon Features) stated he had some ideas for a sequel but the potential film never ended up getting made. The Gingerdead Man would continue to make appearances in some of the later Evil Bong sequels and the two series would officially crossover again in the 3 issue comic series The Gingerdead Man meets Evil Bong published by Action Lab Comics which released in 2018. The comics are loosely inspired by the events in the crossover film.

Reception
JoBlo praised the trailer, writing that it was "hilariously awful". Missoula Independent praised the film for its bringing together two of Full Moon's favorite series.  The reviewer was disturbed by the film's first scenes but stated that the film got better as it progressed.

References

External links
 

2013 horror films
2013 films
2010s Christmas horror films
American films about cannabis
American comedy horror films
Full Moon Features films
Films directed by Charles Band
Puppet films
Horror crossover films
Stoner films
Evil Bong (film series)
Gingerdead Man (film series)
2010s English-language films
2010s American films